Are You Ready for the Country is an album by American country music artist Waylon Jennings, released on RCA Victor in 1976.

Recording and composition
Are You Ready For the Country was the first solo LP Jennings released after the phenomenally successful Wanted! The Outlaws compilation, the first million selling album in country music.  It was co-produced by Jennings and Ken Mansfield and recorded at Sounds Lab in Hollywood, his first sessions in Hollywood since a recording session for A&M in 1964.  According to the 2004 reissue liner notes, most of the basic tracks were recorded between March 24 and March 27.  Despite its title, the album contains several rock covers as the Texan continued developing his brand of progressive country music that had helped spur the outlaw country movement.  However, critics have noted that Are You Ready For the Country does not have the cohesion that had characterized some of his previous studio efforts like Honky Tonk Heroes.  Stephen Thomas Erlewine of AllMusic observes:

"...Jennings' focus was beginning to blur slightly as he lost the sense of purpose that propelled his records of the first half the '70s, from The Taker/Tulsa to Dreaming My Dreams.  Here, the music hasn't really changed, but the flow is no longer seamless and the shifting tones can be a little jarring.  Also, Jennings' songwriting starts to slip a little bit here; none of his originals are bad, and "I'll Go Back to Her" is quite good, but they're all decidedly second tier."

The album's biggest hit was Toy Caldwell's "Can't You See," a song by southern rockers Marshall Tucker Band that had also been featured on Hank Williams, Jr.'s 1975 Hank Williams, Jr. and Friends LP.  The Jennings version peaked at #4 on the country singles chart and reached #97 on the pop chart.  The title track (which hit #7) is a song from Neil Young's seminal 1972 album Harvest and appeared in the 1982 film The Executioner's Song (Jennings would record the duet "Bound For Glory" with Young on his 1985 Old Ways album).  Young's contemporary Graham Nash contributes background vocals to "MacArthur Park (Revisited)", a contemporary take on Jennings' Grammy award winning 1969 single with The Kimberlys. "Precious Memories" is a rare foray into the gospel field for Jennings.  According to Rich Kienzel's liner notes for the 2004 reissue, "Gospel was an area Waylon rarely explored, perhaps because his own religious beliefs included a longstanding ambivalence about organized religion.  As a kid in Texas, he briefly aspired to preach, only to conclude the rigid teachings of his family's church, the Church of Christ, didn't reflect his own more liberal, inclusive philosophies about God and Man." In another nod to the past, "Old Friend" was written by Jennings about Buddy Holly; the latter had been a close friend of his until his death in 1959.  Jennings would continue to include Holly songs on his albums and in his live set, crediting the fellow Texan for helping shape his musical vision.  Jennings also contributed the contrite "I'll Go Back to Her" (which reached #4) and "Too Good Woman (#7), both songs addressing similar themes of forgiveness and repentance.  The singer continued to mine the songbooks of fellow "outlaw" songwriters as well; Donnie Fritts, who had penned the ballad "We Had It All" for Jennings' Honky Tonk Heroes album, wrote the album track "Them Old Love Songs" with Troy Seals, and Shel Silverstein co-wrote the weary "A Couple More Years."

Reception
The album was eventually certified gold, with four top ten singles, and topped the Billboard country albums chart.  It also hit #34 on the pop charts.  Allmusic states that Are You Ready For the Country is "the first time since the late '60s that one of Jennings' albums felt like less than the sum of its parts, and if it didn't necessarily mark the end of the era, it did mark the point when he started to ease back from his startling peak of creativity."  Amazon.com: "Waylon was always sort of a rock-star type within the world of country music, so this 1976 album seemed like a natural..."

Track listing
"Are You Ready for the Country" (Neil Young) – 3:12
"Them Old Love Songs" (Donnie Fritts, Troy Seals) – 3:13
"So Good Woman" (Jennings) – 2:03
"Jack-A-Diamonds" (Daniel Moore) – 3:27
"Can't You See" (Toy Caldwell) – 3:46
"MacArthur Park (Revisited)" (Jimmy Webb) – 6:39
"I'll Go Back to Her" (Jennings) – 3:10
"A Couple More Years" (Dennis Locorriere, Shel Silverstein) – 4:11
"Old Friend" (Jennings) – 3:23
"Precious Memories" (Jennings, Ken Mansfield) – 3:42

Personnel
Waylon Jennings - guitar, vocals
 Carter Robertson - backing vocals 
 Gordon Payne - backing vocals 
 Rance Wasson - backing vocals
 Duke Goff - bass
Sherman Hayes - bass, backing vocals
 Richie Albright - drums
Barry Rudolph - engineer
 John Sands - assistant engineer
 Linda Tyler - aslant engineer
 Billy Graham - fiddle
 John Leslie Hug - guitar
 Jim Gordon - horns
 Mack Johnson - horns
 Maurice Spears - horns
 Graham Nash - backing vocals
 Mike Reese - mastering
 Ralph Mooney - pedal steel, dobro
 Barny Robertson - piano, backing vocals, string arrangement
 The Thomas Buffum String Section - strings

Charts

Weekly charts

Year-end charts

References

Waylon Jennings albums
1976 albums
RCA Records albums